Hum Masala (formerly known as Masala TV) is a 24-hour Urdu language food television channel owned by Hum Network. It is based in Karachi, Pakistan.

History

It was started on 22 November 2006 in Pakistan.

In 2017, Hum Masala was launched in the United Kingdom.

Programs
 Food Dairies

Chefs
 Zubaida Tariq

References

External links
 

Television stations in Pakistan
Television channels and stations established in 2006
Hum Network Limited
2006 establishments in Pakistan
Television stations in Karachi